The Civil Rights Cases, 109 U.S. 3 (1883), were a group of five landmark cases, including US v. Stanley,  in which the Supreme Court of the United States held that the Thirteenth and Fourteenth Amendments did not empower Congress to outlaw racial discrimination by private individuals. The holding that the Thirteenth Amendment did not empower the federal government to punish racist acts done by private citizens would be overturned by the Supreme Court in the 1968 case Jones v. Alfred H. Mayer Co. The Fourteenth Amendment not applying to private entities, however, is still valid precedent to this day. Although the Fourteenth Amendment-related decision has never been overturned, in the 1964 case of Heart of Atlanta Motel, Inc. v. United States, the Supreme Court held that Congress could prohibit racial discrimination by private actors under the Commerce Clause, though that and other loose interpretations of the Clause to expand federal power have been subject to criticism.

During Reconstruction, Congress had passed the Civil Rights Act of 1875, which entitled everyone to access accommodation, public transport, and theaters regardless of race or color. In his majority opinion in the Civil Rights Cases, Associate Justice Joseph P. Bradley struck down the Civil Rights Act of 1875, holding that the Thirteenth Amendment "merely abolishes slavery" and that the Fourteenth Amendment did not give Congress the power to outlaw private acts of racial discrimination. Associate Justice John Marshall Harlan was the lone dissenter in the case, writing that the "substance and spirit of the recent amendments of the constitution have been sacrificed by a subtle and ingenious verbal criticism." The decision ushered in the widespread segregation of blacks in housing, employment, and public life that confined them to second-class citizenship throughout much of the United States until the passage of civil rights legislation in the 1960s.

Background
Black American plaintiffs, in five cases from lower courts, sued theaters, hotels, and transit companies that refused to admit them, or had excluded them from "white only" facilities. The Civil Rights Act of 1875 had been passed by Congress and entitled everyone to access accommodation, public transport, and theaters regardless of race or color. This followed the American Civil War (1860–1865), President Abraham Lincoln's Emancipation Proclamation (1 January 1863) to end slavery, and the Fourteenth Amendment to the US Constitution (9 July 1868), which reads, "No State shall make or enforce any law which shall abridge the privileges or immunities of citizens of the United States; nor shall any State deprive any person of life, liberty, or property, without due process of law; nor deny to any person within its jurisdiction the equal protection of the laws." To implement the principles in the Fourteenth Amendment, Congress had specified that people could not be discriminated against on grounds of race or color in access to services offered to the general public. The business owners contended that the Civil Rights Act of 1875 was itself unconstitutional, and an Act of Congress should not be able to interfere with their private rights of property.

At the supreme court level, the five originally independent cases – United States v. Stanley, United States v. Ryan, United States v. Nichols, United States v. Singleton, and Robinson et ux. v. Memphis & Charleston R.R. Co. – were consolidated for issuing a single judgment.

Judgment
The Supreme Court, in an 8–1 decision by Justice Joseph P. Bradley, held that the language of the 14th Amendment, which prohibited denial of equal protection by a state, did not give Congress power to regulate these private acts, because it was the result of conduct by private individuals, not state law or action, that black people were suffering. Section five empowers Congress only to enforce the prohibition on state action. Legislation by Congress on subjects which are within the domain of the state were, apparently, not authorized by the Fourteenth Amendment. Private acts of racial discrimination were simply private wrongs that the national government was powerless to correct.

Bradley said the following, holding the Constitution did "not authorize Congress to create a code of municipal law for the regulation of private rights," as distinct from "state" laws. In effect, only state bodies were sufficiently "public" so as to be regulated.

... individual invasion of individual rights is not the subject-matter of the [Fourteenth] Amendment. It has a deeper and broader scope. It nullifies and makes void all state legislation, and state action of every kind, which impairs the privileges and immunities of citizens of the United States, or which injures them in life, liberty or property without due process of law, or which denies to any of them the equal protection of the laws. ...

It does not invest congress with power to legislate upon subjects which are within the domain of state legislation; but to provide modes of relief against state legislation, or state action, of the kind referred to. It does not authorize congress to create a code of municipal law for the regulation of private rights; but to provide modes of redress against the operation of state laws, and the action of state officers, executive or judicial, when these are subversive of the fundamental rights specified in the amendment. Positive rights and privileges are undoubtedly secured by the fourteenth amendment; but they are secured by way of prohibition against state laws and state proceedings affecting those rights and privileges, and by power given to congress to legislate for the purpose of carrying such prohibition into effect; and such legislation must necessarily be predicated upon such supposed state laws or state proceedings, and be directed to the correction of their operation and effect. A quite full discussion of this aspect of the amendment may be found in U. S. v. Cruikshank, 92 U. S. 542; Virginia v. Rives, 100 U. S. 313, and Ex parte Virginia, Id. 339.

... it would be running the slavery argument into the ground to make it apply to every act of discrimination which a person may see fit to make as to guests he will entertain, or as to the people he will take into his coach or cab or car; or admit to his concert or theater, or deal with in other matters of intercourse or business. Innkeepers and public carriers, by the laws of all the states, so far as we are aware, are bound, to the extent of their facilities, to furnish proper accommodation to all unobjectionable persons who in good faith apply for them. If the laws themselves make any unjust discrimination, amenable to the prohibitions of the fourteenth amendment, congress has full power to afford a remedy under that amendment and in accordance with it.

When a man has emerged from slavery, and by the aid of beneficent legislation has shaken off the inseparable concomitants of that state, there must be some stage in the progress of his elevation when he takes the rank of a mere citizen, and ceases to be the special favorite of the laws, and when his rights as a citizen, or a man, are to be protected in the ordinary modes by which other men's rights are protected. There were thousands of free colored people in this country before the abolition of slavery, enjoying all the essential rights of life, liberty, and property the same as white citizens; yet no one, at that time, thought that it was any invasion of their personal status as freemen because they were not admitted to all the privileges enjoyed by white citizens, or because they were subjected to discriminations in the enjoyment of accommodations in inns, public conveyances, and places of amusement. Mere discriminations on account of race or color were not regarded as badges of slavery ...

Justice Harlan dissented against the Court's narrow interpretation of the Thirteenth and Fourteenth Amendments for all five of the cases. He argued Congress was attempting to overcome the refusal of the states to protect the rights denied to African Americans that white citizens took as their birthright. Private railroads (Olcott v. Supervisors) were by law public highways, and it was the function of the government to make and maintain highways for the conveyance of the public; that innkeepers have long been held to be "a sort of public servants" (Rex v. Ivens 1835 7 Car. & P. 213) who had no right to deny to anyone "conducting himself in a proper manner" admission to his inn; and that public amusements are maintained under a license coming from the State. He also found that the lack of protection from the 1875 Civil Rights Act would result in the violation of the Privileges or Immunities Clause of the Fourteenth Amendment, largely on the same grounds. Harlan J would have held the Civil Rights Act of 1875 valid, because people were left "practically at the mercy of corporations and individuals wielding power under public authority". His judgment went as follows.

The opinion in these cases proceeds, as it seems to me, upon grounds entirely too narrow and artificial. The substance and spirit of the recent amendments of the constitution have been sacrificed by a subtle and ingenious verbal criticism. 'It is not the words of the law but the internal sense of it that makes the law. The letter of the law is the body; the sense and reason of the law is the soul.' Constitutional provisions, adopted in the interest of liberty, and for the purpose of securing, through national legislation, if need be, rights inhering in a state of freedom, and belonging to American citizenship, have been so construed as to defeat the ends the people desired to accomplish, which they attempted to accomplish, and which they supposed they had accomplished by changes in their fundamental law. By this I do not mean that the determination of these cases should have been materially controlled by considerations of mere expediency or policy. I mean only, in this form, to express an earnest conviction that the court has departed from the familiar rule requiring, in the interpretation of constitutional provisions, that full effect be given to the intent with which they were adopted.

The purpose of the first section of the act of congress of March 1, 1875, was to prevent race discrimination. It does not assume to define the general conditions and limitations under which inns, public conveyances, and places of public amusement may be conducted, but only declares that such conditions and limitations, whatever they may be, shall not be applied, by way of discrimination, on account of race, color, or previous condition of servitude. The second section provides a penalty against any one denying, or aiding or inciting the denial, to any citizen that equality of right given by the first section, except for reasons by law applicable to citizens of every race or color, and regardless of any previous condition of servitude....

The court adjudges that congress is without power, under either the thirteenth or fourteenth amendment, to establish such regulations, and that the first and second sections of the statute are, in all their parts, unconstitutional and void.

[...]

I do not contend that the thirteenth amendment invests congress with authority, by legislation, to regulate the entire body of the civil rights which citizens enjoy, or may enjoy, in the several states. But I do hold that since slavery, as the court has repeatedly declared, was the moving or principal cause of the adoption of that amendment, and since that institution rested wholly upon the inferiority, as a race, of those held in bondage, their freedom necessarily involved immunity from, and protection against, all discrimination against them, because of their race, in respect of such civil rights as belong to freemen of other races. Congress, therefore, under its express power to enforce that amendment, by appropriate legislation, may enact laws to protect that people against the deprivation, on account of their race, of any civil rights enjoyed by other freemen in the same state; and such legislation may be of a direct and primary character, operating upon states, their officers and agents, and also upon, at least, such individuals and corporations as exercise public functions and wield power and authority under the state.

[...]

Such being the relations these corporations hold to the public, it would seem that the right of a colored person to use an improved public highway, upon the terms accorded to freemen of other races, is as fundamental in the state of freedom, established in this country, as are any of the rights which my brethren concede to be so far fundamental as to be deemed the essence of civil freedom. 'Personal liberty consists,' says Blackstone, 'in the power of locomotion, of changing situation, or removing one's person to whatever place one's own inclination may direct, without restraint, unless by due course of law.' But of what value is this right of locomotion, if it may be clogged by such burdens as congress intended by the act of 1875 to remove? They are burdens which lay at the very foundation of the institution of slavery as it once existed. They are not to be sustained, except upon the assumption that there is still, in this land of universal liberty, a class which may yet be discriminated against, even in respect of rights of a character so essential and so supreme, that, deprived of their enjoyment, in common with others, a freeman is not only branded as one inferior and infected, but, in the competitions of life, is robbed of some of the most necessary means of existence; and all this solely because they belong to a particular race which the nation has liberated. The thirteenth amendment alone obliterated the race line, so far as all rights fundamental in a state of freedom are concerned.

[...]

Said Mr. Justice Coleridge, in Rex v. Ivens, 7 Car. & P. 213, (32 E. C. L. 495:)

'An indictment lies against an innkeeper who refuses to receive a guest, he having at the time room in his house; and either the price of the guest's entertainment being tendered to him, or such circumstances occurring as will dispense with that tender. This law is founded in good sense. The innkeeper is not to select his guests. He has no right to say to one, you shall come to my inn, and to another you shall not, as every one coming and conducting himself in a proper manner has a right to be received; and for this purpose innkeepers are a sort of public servants, they having in return a kind of privilege of entertaining travelers and supplying them with that they want.

These authorities are sufficient to show a keeper of an inn is in the exercise of a quasi public employment. The law gives him special privileges, and he is charged with certain duties and responsibilities to the public. The public nature of his employment forbids him from discriminating against any person asking admission as a guest on account of the race or color of that person.

[...]

I also submit whether it can be said—in view of the doctrines of this court as announced in Munn v. Illinois, U.S. 123, and reaffirmed in Peik v. Chicago & N. W. Ry. Co. 94 U.S. 178—that the management of places of public amusement is a purely private matter, with which government has no rightful concern. In the Munn Case the question was whether the state of Illinois could fix, by law, the maximum of charges for the storage of grain in certain warehouses in that state—the private property of individual citizens. After quoting a remark attributed to Lord Chief Justice HALE, to the effect that when private property is 'affected with a public interest it ceases to be juris privati only,' the court says:

'Property does become clothed with a public interest when used in a manner to make it of public consequence and affect the community at large. When, therefore, one devotes his property to a use in which the public has an interest, he in effect grants to the public an interest in that use, and must submit to be controlled by the public for the common good to the extent of the interest he has thus created. He may withdraw his grant by discontinuing the use, but, so long as he maintains the use, he must submit to the control.'

The doctrines of Munn v. Illinois have never been modified by this court, and I am justified, upon the authority of that case, in saying that places of public amusement, conducted under the authority of the law, are clothed with a public interest, because used in a manner to make them of public consequence and to affect the community at large. The law may therefore regulate, to some extent, the mode in which they shall be conducted, and consequently the public have rights in respect of such places which may be vindicated by the law. It is consequently not a matter purely of private concern.

[...]

The colored citizens of other states, within the jurisdiction of that state, could claim, under the constitution, every privilege and immunity which that state secures to her white citizens. Otherwise, it would be in the power of any state, by discriminating class legislation against its own citizens of a particular race or color, to withhold from citizens of other states, belonging to that proscribed race, when within her limits, privileges and immunities of the character regarded by all courts as fundamental in citizenship; and that, too, when the constitutional guaranty is that the citizens of each state shall be entitled to 'all privileges and immunities of citizens of the several states.' No state may, by discrimination against a portion of its own citizens of a particular race, in respect of privileges and immunities fundamental in citizenship, impair the constitutional right of citizens of other states, of whatever race, to enjoy in that state all such privileges and immunities as are there accorded to her most favored citizens. A colored citizen of Ohio or Indiana, being in the jurisdiction of Tennessee, is entitled to enjoy any privilege or immunity, fundamental in citizenship, which is given to citizens of the white race in the latter state. It is not to be supposed that any one will controvert this proposition.

But what was secured to colored citizens of the United States as between them and their respective states—by the grant to them of state citizenship? With what rights, privileges, or immunities did this grant from the nation invest them? There is one, if there be no others—exemption from race discrimination in respect of any civil right belonging to citizens of the white race in the same state. That, surely, is their constitutional privilege when within the jurisdiction of other states. And such must be their constitutional right, in their own state, unless the recent amendments be 'splendid baubles,' thrown out to delude those who deserved fair and generous treatment at the hands of the nation. Citizenship in this country necessarily imports equality of civil rights among citizens of every race in the same state. It is fundamental in American citizenship that, in respect of such rights, there shall be no discrimination by the state, or its officers, or by individuals, or corporations exercising public functions or authority, against any citizen because of his race or previous condition of servitude. In U.S. v. Cruikshank, 92 U. S. 555, it was said that 'the equality of rights of citizens is a principle of republicanism.' And in Ex parte Virginia, 100 U. S. 344, the emphatic language of this court is that 'one great purpose of these amendments was to raise the colored race from that condition of inferiority and servitude in which most of them had previously stood, into perfect equality of civil rights with all other persons within the jurisdiction of the states.' So, in Strauder v. West Virginia, Id. 306, the court, alluding to the fourteenth amendment, said: 'This is one of a series of constitutional provisions having a common purpose, namely, securing to a race recently emancipated, a race that through many generations had been held in slavery, all the civil rights that the superior race enjoy.' Again, in Neal v. Delaware, 103 U. S. 386, it was ruled that this amendment was designed, primarily, 'to secure to the colored race, thereby invested with the rights, privileges, and responsibilities of citizenship, the enjoyment of all the civil rights that, under the law, are enjoyed by white persons.'

[...]

This court has always given a broad and liberal construction to the constitution, so as to enable congress, by legislation, to enforce rights secured by that instrument. The legislation congress may enact, in execution of its power to enforce the provisions of this amendment, is that which is appropriate to protect the right granted. Under given circumstances, that which the court characterizes as corrective legislation might be sufficient. Under other circumstances primary direct legislation may be required. But it is for congress, not the judiciary, to say which is best adapted to the end to be attained. In U.S. v. Fisher, 2 Cranch, 358, this court said that 'congress must possess the choice of means, and must be empowered to use any means which are in fact conducive to the exercise of a power granted by the constitution.' 'The sound construction of the constitution,' said Chief Justice MARSHALL, 'must allow to the national legislature that discretion, with respect to the means by which the powers it confers are to be carried into execution, which will enable that body to perform the high duties assigned to it in the manner most beneficial to the people. Let the end be legitimate,—let it be within the scope of the constitution,—and all means which are appropriate, which are plainly adapted to that end, which are not prohibited, but consistent with the letter and spirit of the constitution, are constitutional.' McCulloch v. Maryland, 4 Wheat. 423.

Must these rules of construction be now abandoned? Are the powers of the national legislature to be restrained in proportion as the rights and privileges, derived from the nation, are more valuable? Are constitutional provisions, enacted to secure the dearest rights of freemen and citizens, to be subjected to that rule of construction, applicable to private instruments, which requires that the words to be interpreted must be taken most strongly against those who employ them? Or shall it be remembered that 'a constitution of government, founded by the people for themselves and their posterity, and for objects of the most momentous nature,—for perpetual union, for the establishment of justice, for the general welfare, and for a perpetuation of the blessings of liberty,—necessarily requires that every interpretation of its powers should have a constant reference to these objects? No interpretation of the words in which those powers are granted can be a sound one which narrows down their ordinary import so as to defeat those objects.' 1 Story, Const. § 422.

[...]

In every material sense applicable to the practical enforcement of the fourteenth amendment, railroad corporations, keepers of inns, and managers of places of public amusement are agents of the state, because amenable, in respect of their public duties and functions, to public regulation. It seems to me that, within the principle settled in Ex parte Virginia, a denial by these instrumentalities of the state to the citizen, because of his race, of that equality of civil rights secured to him by law, is a denial by the state within the meaning of the fourteenth amendment. If it be not, then that race is left, in respect of the civil rights under discussion, practically at the mercy of corporations and individuals wielding power under public authority....

[...]

What I affirm is that no state, nor the officers of any state, nor any corporation or individual wielding power under state authority for the public benefit or the public convenience, can, consistently either with the freedom established by the fundamental law, or with that equality of civil rights which now belongs to every citizen, discriminate against freemen or citizens, in their civil rights, because of their race, or because they once labored under disabilities imposed upon them as a race. The rights which congress, by the act of 1875, endeavored to secure and protect are legal, not social, rights. The right, for instance, of a colored citizen to use the accommodations of a public highway upon the same terms as are permitted to white citizens is no more a social right than his right, under the law, to use the public streets of a city, or a town, or a turnpike road, or a public market, or a post-office, or his right to sit in a public building with others, of whatever race, for the purpose of hearing the political questions of the day discussed. Scarcely a day passes without our seeing in this court-room citizens of the white and black races sitting side by side watching the progress of our business. It would never occur to any one that the presence of a colored citizen in a court-house or court-room was an invasion of the social rights of white persons who may frequent such places. And yet such a suggestion would be quite as sound in law—I say it with all respect—as is the suggestion that the claim of a colored citizen to use, upon the same terms as is permitted to white citizens, the accommodations of public highways, or public inns, or places of public amusement, established under the license of the law, is an invasion of the social rights of the white race.

[...]

The one underlying purpose of congressional legislation has been to enable the black race to take the rank of mere citizens. The difficulty has been to compel a recognition of their legal right to take that rank, and to secure the enjoyment of privileges belonging, under the law, to them as a component part of the people for whose welfare and happiness government is ordained. At every step in this direction the nation has been confronted with class tyranny, which a contemporary English historian says is, of all tyrannies, the most intolerable, 'for it is ubiquitous in its operation, and weighs, perhaps, most heavily on those whose obscurity or distance would withdraw them from the notice of a single despot.' To-day it is the colored race which is denied, by corporations and individuals wielding public authority, rights fundamental in their freedom and citizenship. At some future time it may be some other race that will fall under the ban. If the constitutional amendments be enforced, according to the intent with which, as I conceive, they were adopted, there cannot be, in this republic, any class of human beings in practical subjection to another class, with power in the latter to dole out to the former just such privileges as they may choose to grant. The supreme law of the land has decreed that no authority shall be exercised in this country upon the basis of discrimination, in respect of civil rights, against freemen and citizens because of their race, color, or previous condition of servitude. To that decree—for the due enforcement of which, by appropriate legislation, congress has been invested with express power—every one must bow, whatever may have been, or whatever now are, his individual views as to the wisdom or policy, either of the recent changes in the fundamental law, or of the legislation which has been enacted to give them effect.

For the reasons stated I feel constrained to withhold my assent to the opinion of the court.

Significance
The decision met with public protest across the country, and led to regular "indignation meetings" held in numerous cities. State officials in the South took advantage of the eclipsed role of Congress in the prohibition of racial discrimination and proceeded to embody individual practices of racial segregation into laws that legalized the treatment of blacks as second-class citizens for another seventy years. The court's decision thus ultimately led to the enactment of state laws, such as Jim Crow Laws, which codified what had previously been individual adherence to the practice of racial segregation. Several northern and western states however did not follow suit and began instead enacting their own bans on discrimination in public places.

Harlan correctly predicted the decision's long-term consequences: it put an end to the attempts by Radical Republicans to ensure the civil rights of blacks and ushered in the widespread segregation of blacks in housing, employment and public life that confined them to second-class citizenship throughout much of the United States until the passage of civil rights legislation in the 1960s in the wake of the Civil Rights Movement.

Furthermore, 
In the wake of the Supreme Court ruling, the federal government adopted as policy that allegations of continuing slavery were matters whose prosecution should be left to local authorities only – a de facto acceptance that white southerners could do as they wished with the black people in their midst.

The decision that the Reconstruction-era Civil Rights Acts were unconstitutional has not been overturned; on the contrary, the Supreme Court reaffirmed this limited reading of the Fourteenth Amendment in United States v. Morrison, in which it held that Congress did not have the authority to enact parts of the Violence Against Women Act.

The Court has, however, upheld more recent civil rights laws based on other powers of Congress. Title II of the Civil Rights Act of 1964 generally revived the ban on discrimination in public accommodations that was in the Civil Rights Act of 1875, but under the Commerce Clause of Article I instead of the 14th Amendment; the Court held Title II to be constitutional in Heart of Atlanta Motel v. United States, .

See also
US labor law
List of United States Supreme Court cases, volume 109
United States v. Cruikshank
Plessy v. Ferguson
Constantine v Imperial Hotels Ltd [1944] KB 693

Notes

References
 
, Third Part, Chapter VI, "The Supreme Court Decision."

External links

 
 "Supreme Court Landmark Case The Civil Rights Cases" from C-SPAN's Landmark Cases: Historic Supreme Court Decisions

1883 in United States case law
Reconstruction Era legislation
United States equal protection case law
United States federal civil rights legislation
United States Fourteenth Amendment, section five case law
United States Supreme Court cases
United States Supreme Court cases of the Waite Court